Stride Right is an album by American jazz saxophonist Johnny Hodges and pianist/organist Earl "Fatha" Hines featuring performances recorded in 1966 and released on the Verve label.

Reception

AllMusic reviewer Ken Dryden stated: "The 1966 meeting of alto saxophonist Johnny Hodges and pianist Earl Hines in the studio should be considered a cause for celebration for swing fans. ...highly recommended".

Track listing
All compositions by Earl Hines, except as indicated.
 "Caution Blues" - 2:53
 "Stride Right" - 2:55
 "Rosetta" (Earl Hines, Henri Woode) - 3:34
 "Perdido" (Juan Tizol, Ervin Drake, Hans Lengsfelder) - 5:05
 "Fantastic, That's You" (George Cates, George Douglas) - 2:52
 "Tale of the Fox" (Mercer Ellington, Johnny Hodges) - 4:36
 "I'm Beginning to See the Light" (Duke Ellington, Don George, Johnny Hodges, Harry James) - 2:55
 "C Jam Blues" (Ellington) - 5:05
 "Tippin' In" (Bobby Smith, Marty Symes) - 3:07

Personnel
Johnny Hodges - alto saxophone
Earl "Fatha" Hines - piano, organ 
Kenny Burrell - guitar
Richard Davis - double bass
Joe Marshall - drums

References 

1966 albums
Johnny Hodges albums
Earl Hines albums
Albums produced by Creed Taylor
Verve Records albums
Albums recorded at Van Gelder Studio